Neoleroya was a monotypic genus of flowering plants in the family Rubiaceae but is no longer recognized. The genus contained only one species, i.e. Neoleroya verdcourtii, which is endemic to Madagascar. It was sunk into synonymy with Pyrostria.

References

External links 
 World Checklist of Rubiaceae

Monotypic Rubiaceae genera
Historically recognized Rubiaceae genera
Vanguerieae